Michael Edmund Burke (October 15, 1863 – December 12, 1918) was a U.S. Representative from Wisconsin.

Born in Beaver Dam, Wisconsin, Burke attended local public schools and graduated from the Wayland Academy in Beaver Dam in 1884. He studied law at the University of Wisconsin–Madison in 1886 and 1887. He was admitted to the bar in 1888 and commenced practice in Beaver Dam. He served as town clerk from 1887 to 1889. He served as member of the Wisconsin State Assembly from 1891 to 1893. He served in the Wisconsin State Senate from 1895 to 1899. Burke married Emma Sontag (1875–1921) in 1898. Burke served as city attorney of Beaver Dam from 1893 to 1908. He served as delegate to the Democratic National Convention in 1904.

Burke was elected mayor of Beaver Dam and served from 1908 to 1910.

Burke was elected as a Democrat to the Sixty-second United States Congress representing Wisconsin's 6th congressional district from March 4, 1911 till March 3, 1913. He was reelected to the Sixty-third, and Sixty-fourth Congresses this time as a representative of Wisconsin's 2nd congressional district (March 4, 1913 – March 3, 1917). He was an unsuccessful candidate for reelection in 1916. He died at Beaver Dam, Wisconsin, December 12, 1918. He was interred in St. Patrick's Cemetery.

References

External links

 

1863 births
1918 deaths
Democratic Party Wisconsin state senators
University of Wisconsin–Madison alumni
University of Wisconsin Law School alumni
Democratic Party members of the Wisconsin State Assembly
Politicians from Beaver Dam, Wisconsin
Democratic Party members of the United States House of Representatives from Wisconsin
19th-century American politicians
Wayland Academy, Wisconsin alumni